Supercrambus is a genus of moths of the family Crambidae. It contains only one species, Supercrambus albiradialis, which is found in Brazil (Rio de Janeiro, Parana).

References

Natural History Museum Lepidoptera genus database

Crambini
Moths of South America
Monotypic moth genera
Crambidae genera
Taxa named by Stanisław Błeszyński